The Irish Sport Horse or Irish Hunter has been successful in show jumping. Some have won medals or been placed at events including the Olympic Games, the Show Jumping World Championships, the European Show Jumping Championships, the Show Jumping World Cup and the Pan-American Games.

{| class="wikitable"
|- 
! style="color: white; background-color: green;" |Achievement
! style="color: white; background-color: green;" |Rider
! style="color: white; background-color: green;" |Horse
! style="color: white; background-color: green;" |Sire
! style="color: white; background-color: green;" |Dam
! style="color: white; background-color: green;" |Dam's sire
|-
|1960 Olympic Individual Silver
| Piero D'Inzeo, Italy
| The Rock
| Water Serpent (xx)
| (ISH)
| 
|- 
| 1960 World Champion
| Raimondo D'Inzeo, Italy
| Gowran Girl
| Water Serpent (xx)
| (ISH)
| 
|-
| 
| Graziano Mancinelli, Italy
| Rockette
| Water Serpent (xx)
| (ISH)
| 
|-
| 1970 World Champion
| David Broome, United Kingdom
| Beethoven
| (xx)
| (ID)
| 
|-
| 1972 Olympic Individual Gold
| Graziano Mancinelli
| Ambassador
| Nordlys (xx)
| (Co. Waterford ID)
| (ID)
|-
| 1976 Olympic Team Silver
| Sönke Sönksen, West Germany
| Kwepe
| Nordlys (xx)
| (xx)
| (xx)
|-
| 1978 World Individual Silver
| Eddie Macken, Ireland
| Boomerang
| Battleburn (xx)
| 
| 
|-
| 1982 World Team Bronze 
| David Broome, United Kingdom
| Mr Ross  
|  Carnival Night(xx)
|  Castleisland Comefast (RID)
|  Sang Froid (RID)
|-
| 1982 World Individual Silver
| Malcolm Pyrah, United Kingdom
| 
| Jaycee (xx)
| (Co. Cork ID)
| 
|-
| 1984 Olympic Team Silver
| John Whitaker, United Kingdom
| Ryans Son
| Ozymandias (xx)
| (Conn/Cyld)
| 
|-
| 1984 Olympic Individual Bronze
| Heidi Robbiani, Switzerland
| Jessica V
| Candelabra (xx)
| Gentle Miss (ISH)
| 
|-
| 1988 Olympic Team Silver
| Joseph Fargis, United States
| Mill Pearl
| 
| Carran (xx)
| Anthony (xx)
|-
| 1992 Olympic Individual Bronze
| 
| Irish 
| Regular Guy (xx)
| Loughahoe Star (xx)
| Sandyman Star (xx)
|-
| 1996 Olympic Team Bronze
| Rodrigo Pessoa, Brazil
| Loro Piana TomBoy 
| Coevers (xx)
| Francis (ISH)
| Jab (xx)
|-
| 1999 World Cup Final 2nd
| Trevor Coyle, Ireland
| Cruising
|  Seacrest (RID)
|  Mullacrew (ISH)
|  Nordlys (xx)
|-
| 
| Kevin Babington, Ireland
| Carling King  
|  Clover Hill (RID)
|  Gortnageer Star (ISH)
| Chair Lift (xx)
|-
| 2001 European Team Champions
| Dermott Lennon, Ireland
| Liscalgot
| Touchdown (ISH)
| Tulas Pride (ISH)
| Tula Rocket (xx)
|-
| 2002 World Champion
| Dermott Lennon
| Liscalgot
| Touchdown (ISH)
| Tulas Pride (ISH)
| Tula Rocket (xx)
|-
| 2004 Olympics eq. 4th
| Robert Smith, United Kingdom
| Mr. Springfield
|  Western Promise (ISH)
|  Glebe Bess (RID)
| 
|-
| 2004 Olympics eq. 4th
| Kevin Babington, Ireland
| Carling King  
|  Clover Hill (RID)
|  Gortnageer Star (ISH)
| Chair Lift (xx)
|-
| 2007 World Cup Final 2nd
| Rich Fellers, United States
| Flexible
|  Cruising (ISH)
|  Flex (ISH)
| Safari (xx)
|-
| 2012 World Cup Final Champion
| Rich Fellers
| Flexible
|  Cruising (ISH)
|  Flex (ISH)
| Safari (xx)
|-
|}

References 
Irish Horse Board search
Irish Draught blood
All Breed search
Sporthorse Breed database
Showjumping Association of Ireland (SJAI)
Water Serpent

show jumpers
Show jumping horses